The 1947–48 Rugby Union County Championship was the 48th edition of England's premier rugby union club competition at the time.

Lancashire won the competition for the fifth time after defeating Eastern Counties in the final.

Final

See also
 English rugby union system
 Rugby union in England

References

Rugby Union County Championship
County Championship (rugby union) seasons